Acacia cataractae is a shrub belonging to the genus Acacia and the subgenus Juliflorae that is native to northern Australia.

Description
It has angled to almost flattened glabrous branchlets with resinous crenulated ridges. Like most species of Acacia it has phyllodes rather than true leaves. The evergreen phyllodes have an oblanceolate to narrowly elliptic shape and are flat and straight to slightly curved. It blooms between December and July producing golden flowers. The woody, brown seed pods that form after flowering have a narrowly oblanceolate shape with a gradually tapering base.

Distribution
It is endemic to the northern parts of the Northern Territory including Bathurst Island and from around Maningrida in the north to Umbrawarra Gorge near Pine Creek in the south. It is often situated around or close to streams in sandstone plateaux and gorges country and on coastal flats where it grows in sandy soils.

See also
List of Acacia species

References

cataractae
Flora of the Northern Territory
Plants described in 1992